Kim Tiilikainen (born 8 July 1975) is a former professional tennis player from Finland, now a tennis coach.

Tiilikainen qualified for his only Grand Slam in 1996, at the French Open. The only Finn in the draw, he was defeated by world no. 27 Andrea Gaudenzi in the opening round.

From 1995 to 2003, Tiilikainen appeared in nine Davis Cup ties for Finland. He won nine matches, all in singles. His best performances include a win over Anastasios Vasiliadis in the fifth and deciding rubber against Greece in 1997 and when he came from two sets down to beat Italian Davide Sanguinetti in 2002. He is the current coach of the Finland Davis Cup team and has coached Polish tennis player Jerzy Janowicz.

References

1975 births
Living people
Finnish male tennis players
Sportspeople from Helsinki
Finnish tennis coaches
Finnish expatriate sportspeople in Poland